Phytophthora hibernalis is a plant pathogen infecting citruses.

References

External links
 Index Fungorum
 USDA ARS Fungal Database

hibernalis
Water mould plant pathogens and diseases
Citrus diseases